
Year 766 (DCCLXVI) was a common year starting on Wednesday (link will display the full calendar) of the Julian calendar. The denomination 766 for this year has been used since the early medieval period, when the Anno Domini calendar era became the prevalent method in Europe for naming years.

Events 
 By place 

 Byzantine Empire 
 August 25 – Emperor Constantine V publicly humiliates 19 high-ranking officials in the Hippodrome of Constantinople, after discovering a plot against him. He executes the leaders, Constantine Podopagouros and his brother Strategios, and blinds and exiles the rest.
 Autumn – Siege of Kamacha: Abbasid forces under al-Hasan ibn Qahtaba are defeated at the fortress city of Kamacha, in eastern Cappadocia (modern Turkey). A Byzantine relief army (12,000 men) forces the Abbasids to retreat into Armenia.
 Sabin, ruler (khagan) of Bulgaria, flees to the Byzantine fortress city of Mesembria, from where he escapes to Constantinople. Constantine V arranges for the transfer of Sabin's family from Bulgaria.

 Abbasid Caliphate 
 Baghdad nears completion as up to 100,000 labourers create a circular city about 1 or 2 km in diameter (depending on the source). In the center of the "Round City" is a palace built for Caliph al-Mansur. The capital is ringed by three lines of walls (approximate date).

 Asia 
 The Karluks defeat the Turgesh Khaganate in Central Asia. Most of Turkestan (former Onoq territory) falls under Karluk rule, except west of Lake Aral, where the loose confederation of the Oghuz Turks is about to emerge.

 By topic 

 Religion 
 Summer – Patriarch Constantine II is deposed and jailed, after the discovery of Constantine Podopagouros' plot against Constantine V. Nicetas I is appointed patriarch of Constantinople.
 Metten Abbey, near the town of Deggendorf (Bavaria), is founded by Gamelbert of Michaelsbuch.

Births 
 Al-Fadl ibn Yahya al-Barmaki, Muslim governor (d. 808)
 Ali al-Ridha, 8th Shia Imam (d. 818)
 Harun al-Rashid, Muslim caliph (or 763)
 Li Cheng, chancellor of the Tang Dynasty
 Zhang Ji, Chinese scholar and poet (approximate date)

Deaths 
 March 6 – Chrodegang, Frankish bishop
 August 25
 Constantine Podopagouros, Byzantine official
 Strategios Podopagouros, Byzantine general
 Abdullah al-Aftah, Shī‘ah Imam and Muslim scholar
 Fallomon mac Con Congalt, king of Mide (Ireland)
 Fujiwara no Matate, Japanese nobleman (b. 715)
 Muhammad ibn al-Ash'ath al-Khuza'i, Muslim governor

References